Celiptera levinum is a moth of the family Erebidae. It is found in Surinam, Colombia, Brazil (Rondonia, Espirito Santo, Rio de Janeiro, São Paulo, Santa Catarina), Haiti, the Dominican Republic and Cuba.

References

Moths described in 1782
Celiptera